Saraswati Education Society is an Indian public charitable trust which was formed on 10 October 2003 by Dr Nandkumar Y. Tasgaonkar, who serves as its chairman.  Since its inception, the trust has established ten institutions at Bhivpuri Road station, Karjat, Raigad district, Maharashtra, which provide professional courses in engineering, management, pharmacy and medical. All the post graduate and degree courses are approved by AICTE, UGC and DTE, and affiliated to Mumbai University. The diploma courses are recognised by the respective boards under the State Government of Maharashtra. The medical colleges are recognised and affiliated by the respective university and council's. There are more than eight thousand students and more than one thousand teaching and non-teaching staff.

Engineering (degree)
 Yadavrao Tasgaonkar Institute of Engineering & Technology
 Yadavrao Tasgaonkar College of Engineering & Management
 Saraswati Education Society, Group of Institutions, Faculty of Engineering

Engineering (diploma)
Yadavrao Tasgaonkar Polytechnic  (YTP)
 Nandkumar Y Tasgaonkar Polytechnic

Management
 Yadavrao Tasgaonkar Institute of Management Studies & Research
 Yadavrao Tasgaonkar Institute of School of Business Management
 Saraswati Education Society, Group of Institutions, Institute Faculty Of Management

Pharmacy
Yadavrao Tasgaonkar Institute of Pharmacy (Degree)
Yadavrao Tasgaonkar Institute Of Pharmacy (Diploma)

Medical - Health care 
Raigad Hospital And Research Center (RHRC)
Dr.N. Y. Tasgaonkar Institute of Medical science (NYTIMS)
Dr. N. Y. Tasgaonkar College of Physiotherapy (NYTCP)
Jeevak Ayurved Rugnalay
Sau. Vandana N. Tasgaonkar Ayurved Mahavidya and Research (VNTAMR)

Education in Raigad district
Engineering colleges in Mumbai
Engineering colleges in Maharashtra
Pharmacy colleges in Maharashtra
2003 establishments in Maharashtra